Symphony No. 32 may refer to:

 Symphony No. 32 (Haydn)
 Symphony No. 32 (Michael Haydn)
 Symphony No. 32 (Mozart)

032